The following is a list of buildings in the Halifax Regional Municipality, Nova Scotia with articles on Wikipedia.

References